The ATP Cup was an international outdoor hard court men's tennis team tournament, which ran from 2020 to 2022. The tournament was played across one or three Australian cities over ten days in the lead up to the Australian Open, and featured teams from 12, 16 or 24 countries. The event was the first ATP team competition since the ATP World Team Cup, which was held in Düsseldorf from 1978 to 2012.

History
On 2 July 2018, ATP director Chris Kermode announced that he had plans to organise a men's team tennis tournament in response to the Davis Cup changing their format six months earlier.

The tournament at the time of the announcement had the name World Team Cup, taking from the previous World Team Cup that took place in Düsseldorf from 1978 to 2012.

On 15 November, the ATP and Tennis Australia announced that the tournament would be known as the ATP Cup, with 24 teams playing at three cities in preparation for the Australian Open. Those cities would later be revealed to be Sydney, Brisbane and Perth, while the event's inclusion also forced the axing of the Hopman Cup.

The tournament took place in Sydney, Brisbane, and Perth, with Sydney the hosts of the quarter-finals onwards. In 2021, the tournament was deferred several weeks, and moved to Melbourne Park with 12 teams, due to the restrictions on domestic travel in Australia stemming from the COVID-19 pandemic. The 2022 event would be held in Sydney with 16 teams as these restrictions were ongoing.

Following the 2022 Russian invasion of Ukraine, the ITF debarred Russia and Belarus from competing at the tournament.

On 7 August 2022, Tennis Australia announced that the ATP Cup would be shut down, to be replaced by a mixed-gender United Cup from 2023.

Qualification
The teams that participated in the Cup were determined by the singles ranking of their best player. In the week after the US Open, 18 teams were announced, based on the best player singles ranking. For a country to qualify, it had to have at least three players with ATP ranking, and two of them with singles ranking. The next six teams were announced the week of the ATP Finals. If the host did not qualify on the first deadline of September, it would be awarded a wild card, leaving only five spots for the November deadline.

Tournament
The format saw 24 teams divided into six groups of four teams each. The teams faced in ties composed of two singles matches and one doubles match. The match between the No. 2 of each team  opened the tie, then the No.1 of each team, and the doubles match closing the tie. The doubles match would be played regardless whether the tie is decided or not. The winner from each group was joined by the two best second placed teams in the quarterfinals of the tournament for three knock-out rounds, culminating in the champion being crowned.

Finals

Results by nation

References

External links
 Official website

ATP Cup
Tennis tournaments in Australia
Hard court tennis tournaments
ATP Tour
Recurring sporting events established in 2020
2020 establishments in Oceania
Sports competitions in Brisbane
Sports competitions in Perth, Western Australia
Sports competitions in Sydney
Annual sporting events in Australia
International men's tennis team competitions
Recurring sporting events disestablished in 2022
2022 disestablishments in Oceania